The Margaret River Pro 2017 is an event of the Association of Surfing Professionals for 2017 World Surf League.

This event was held from 29 March to 9 April at Margaret River, Western Australia and contested by 36 surfers.

Round 1

Round 2

Round 3

Round 4

Round 5

Quarter finals

Semi finals

Final

References
 Results

2017 World Surf League
Margaret River Pro